Lakeridge Health Bowmanville is a fully accredited hospital in Clarington, Ontario, Canada, servicing the municipality of Clarington. It is run by Lakeridge Health Corporation, part of the Central East Local Health Integration Network.

The hospital was founded as Memorial Hospital Bowmanville in 1913.

In 1998 the hospital, along with North Durham Health Services (Community Memorial Hospital Port Perry and Uxbridge Cottage Hospital), Oshawa General Hospital and Whitby General Hospital, were placed under the administration of the Lakeridge Health Corporation. Memorial Hospital was subsequently renamed, and Uxbridge Cottage Hospital has left the partnership and is now a site of the Markham Stouffville Hospital.

Due to budget cuts in mid-2022, Lakeridge Health Bowmanville closed its urgent care centre, sending its staff to work at the Oshawa Lakeridge Health location.

History (Memorial Hospital Bowmanville)
The former private residence, constructed in the 1850s only steps from the present hospital, was purchased in 1912 by J.W. Alexander, President of the Dominion Organ and Piano Company, who donated it for use as a hospital. This building was demolished and a new building on the same site was formally opened on July 31, 1951.

Over the years, more renovations and additions were needed to house the extensive programs and services offered. On June 11, 2009, the Lakeridge Health Board of Trustees approved several new projects at Lakeridge Health Bowmanville, including mammography, coffee kiosk and gift shop projects. In July 2011, Lakeridge Health announced the opening of a new space for its Critical Care unit. Expansions related to the Emergency Department and day surgery are expected to occur in the near future.

An expansion to the hospital was announced in January 2018.

Heliport

A ground level heliport is located east of the hospital at the end of the parking lot facing a number of homes near Frank Street.

Patients will need to transfer via ambulance to get to the interior of the main hospital building.

References

External links 
 
 Lakeridge Health Bowmanville at Information Durham
 News Release: Commission recommends $329 million reinvestment in health services in the GTA/905

Hospital buildings completed in 1913
Hospitals in the Regional Municipality of Durham
Hospitals established in 1913
Buildings and structures in Clarington
Heliports in Ontario
Certified airports in Ontario
1913 establishments in Ontario